Eikenes Station is a former railway station on the Vestfold Line serving the village of Eikenes in Larvik, Norway. The station was served by regional trains operated by the Norwegian State Railways. The station opened in 1899.

External links
Jernbaneverket's entry on Eikenes station 

Railway stations in Larvik
Railway stations on the Vestfold Line
Railway stations opened in 1899
1899 establishments in Norway